The 1974 Rice Owls football team was an American football team that represented Rice University in the Southwest Conference during the 1974 NCAA Division I football season. In their third year under head coach Al Conover, the team compiled a 2–8–1 record.

Schedule

References

Rice
Rice Owls football seasons
Rice Owls football